Life Starts Here is the second and last album by the Airport 5, released in 2002.

Track listing
All songs written by Robert Pollard and Tobin Sprout.

Intro - 1.07
We're In The Business - 2.31
Yellow Wife No. 5 - 2.11
Wrong Drama Addiction (...And Life Starts Here...) - 7.25
However Young They Are - 2.38
The Dawntrust Guarantee - 1.14
Forever Since - 2.40
Impressions Of A Leg - 2.21
How Brown? - 4.39
Natives Approach Our Plane - 3.02
I Can't Freeze Anymore - 3.30
Out In The World - 2.33

References

2002 albums